Diana Hill may refer to:

 Diana Hill (painter) (–1844), English miniaturist
 Diana Hill (scientist) (born 1943), New Zealand geneticist

See also
 Dana Hill
 Diana Hall